Allambie is a location in the Northern Beaches Council local government area, in Sydney, New South Wales, Australia. It has been designated an "Urban Place" by the Geographical Names Board of New South Wales.

References

Sydney localities